Toxic Narcotic is an American crust punk band from Boston, Massachusetts, United States, who formed in 1989. Though many label them crust or hardcore, they do not self-identify with any one specific subgenre of DIY punk. Their songs typically include anti-war, -violence, and green peace lyrics. Their name, as revealed in an interview with Vice, is associated with the movement, the lead singer saying "... The name means what is says. Narcotics, chemicals, and ignorance are toxic, not just to the human mind, but also to humanity in general." Most of their albums have been released on their label, Rodent Popsicle Records. The album We're All Doomed was released in 2002 on Go-Kart Records and a split CD with Misery was released in 2004, also on Go-Kart Records. Their 15th anniversary show in December, 2004, was filmed by Subversion Media and released on Rodent Popsicle Records. The band toured the United States and Europe extensively through their career. In 2005, the band performed at North East Sticks Together. Later that year, Toxic Narcotic went on hiatus and two of its members, Bill Damon and Will Sullivan, formed the band Mouth Sewn Shut. Bill Damon, the vocalist, runs Rodent Popsicle Records. Sam Jodrey, the drummer, hurt his back in 2008 and all following shows had to be cancelled.

Discography

EPs
Populution (1992)
New Ways To Create Waste (1993)
2Oz. Slab Of Hate (1993)
You Wreckt Em (1996)
Damn Near Killed Em (1997)
Had it Coming (2002)
Shoot People, Not Dope (2003)
Beer In The Shower (2003)

Studio albums
89-99 (2000)
We're All Doomed (2002)

Splits
Toxic Narcotic/Whorehouse Of Representatives (1997)
Bostons Finest - Toxic Narcotic / The Unseen (1998)
Toxic Narcotic/August Spies (1999)
The Split - Toxic Narcotic / A Global Threat (2001)
Toxic Narcotic / Misery (2004)

References

External links
Official Toxic Narcotic Web site
 Toxic Narcotic on Myspace

American crust and d-beat groups
Hardcore punk groups from Massachusetts
Musical groups established in 1989
Musical groups from Boston